The 1876 Rhode Island gubernatorial election was held on April 5, 1876. Incumbent Republican Governor Henry Lippitt defeated Prohibition Party nominee Albert C. Howard and Democratic nominee William B. Beach.

Since no candidate received a majority in the popular vote, Lippitt was elected by the Rhode Island General Assembly per the state constitution.

General election

Candidates
Major party candidates
Henry Lippitt, Republican
William B. Beach, Democratic 

Other candidates
Albert C. Howard, Prohibition. Howard was also supported by Republicans opposed to Lippitt.

Results

Legislative election
As no candidate received a majority of the vote, the Rhode Island General Assembly was required to decide the election, choosing among the top two vote-getters, Lippitt and Howard. The legislative election was held on May 30, 1876.

Notes

References

Bibliography 
 

1876
Rhode Island
Gubernatorial